Colton Hall is a government building and museum in Monterey, California, United States.  It was built in 1847-49 by Walter Colton, who arrived in Monterey as the chaplain on Commodore Robert F. Stockton's vessel. He remained and was named as Monterey's first alcalde (mayor) in the American Period. Colton Hall originally contained rooms downstairs for a public school and government assembly hall upstairs. It was the site of California's first constitutional convention in 1849.

Building construction 

Upon becoming the elected alcalde Colton decided to build a school in Monterey, he decided that it would be in the style of the buildings he was familiar with from Philadelphia and Washington DC, the Greek Revival style. He wrote in his diary, 

As the alcalde, Colton served as mayor, coroner, judge, sheriff, in charge of weights and measures, prosecutor, and a tax collector. In order to raise funds and free labor, Colton took full advantage of his "absolute" powers. He would tax cantinas, alcohol, and gambling, sell city lots, and used the money toward the building. When he found someone "misbehaving" he would arrest them as the sheriff, throw them in jail and act as the judge, often sentencing them to labor on the school. When the building was completed on March 8, 1849, it was the largest public building in California. When his tenure as Alcalde was completed, a citizens committee convened to commend him for his service. They named the new building in his honor "Colton Hall."

The Native Sons of the Golden West were instrumental in 1903 in securing a legislative appropriation for necessary repairs on Colton Hall. The building was then registered as a California Historical Landmark in 1934. A single-story, solid granite block building is attached to the eastern side of Colton Hall. It was the city jail until 1956. The dark, barred cells today display sleeping cots, guitars, and other artifacts that may have been in use by inmates.

In October 2018, the City of Monterey completed a $353, 000 renovation. This included a back stairway, deck, courtyard, and parking lot. The building became compliant with the American Disabilities Act with the installation of a chair lift and ADA restroom. “'We are excited to welcome all visitors to our exhibits and events in Colton Hall, ” said Mayor Clyde Roberson ...“This is a perfect example of a Neighborhood Improvement Program project. '”

California Constitution 

California's military governor called for a constitutional convention to be held in Monterey's Colton Hall. The 48 delegates from ten districts met  on the upper floor from September 1 to October 15, 1849 to debate and write California's first state constitution. The stairway leading to the convention hall at the time was in the rear of the building. The California Constitution was ratified on October 13, voted on in November that year and sent to Congress in January 1850. San Jose was chosen as the seat for the first Legislature.

Colton Hall School 

Originally built to be a school for Monterey children, it became the district school office as well as a grade school in 1873. In 1897 the school moved to a bigger building nearby. The Monterey Weekly Herald reported in 1875, "Surely the children of Monterey cannot fail to imbibe knowledge within such a building, the very air of which is redolent with patriotism and learning".

Current history 

The most important public office building in Monterey County still in continuous use, Colton Hall has over the years housed Monterey's City Hall, a public school, the county court house, the sheriff's office, and Monterey's city police headquarters. The second floor is a museum which was established in 1949. According to the museum's website it is open for free daily from 10-4pm. A docent is on staff during these hours for information and tours. The second floor assembly hall has been restored to appear as it did when the 48 delegates of the first Constitution Convention met there.

Interior

Exterior

References

External links 

 Colton Hall Museum

Buildings and structures in Monterey, California
California Historical Landmarks
History museums in California
Museums in Monterey County, California
Tourist attractions in Monterey County, California
History of the Monterey Bay Area
History of Monterey County, California